Fastias is one of 44 parishes (administrative divisions) in Tineo, a municipality within the province and autonomous community of Asturias, in northern Spain.

It has a population of 75.

Villages and hamlets
 El Fondal
 Los Cepones
 La Paniciegas
 Peñafolgueros
 Fastias

References

Parishes in Tineo